Yardcore is the second and final studio album by Born Jamericans. The title track was released as single on CD and 12" vinyl, with several remixes.

"Yardcore" reached #8 on the U.S. Hot Rap Singles chart. The album ranked #14 on Billboard'''s list of the best-selling reggae albums of 1997.

Critical receptionThe Washington Post'' praised the album, writing: "Jamericans work in the reggae dancehall tradition of growling deejay (Shine) and silky-smooth singer (Notch), and underneath is essential jeep music, with all the thuds and thumps of a dancehall-hip-hop fusion."

Track listing
Prodigal Sons [Written by Horace Payne, Norman Howell, Benoit Tshiwala]
Yardcore [H. Payne, N. Howell, B. Tshiwala]
State of Shock IV (featuring Johnny Osbourne) [N. Howell, Errol Osbourne, H. Payne, B. Tshiwala, Jepther McClymont, and Phillip Burrell]
Superstar  [H. Payne, N. Howell, and B. Tshiwala]
Rassclot [H. Payne, N. Howell, and B. Tshiwala]
Back for Good [Gary Barlow]
Send My Love (Interlude) (Stevland Morris)
Send My Love/Send One Your Love (Stevland Morris)
C'yaan Done [H. Payne and N. Howell]
Wherever We Go [H. Payne and N. Howell]
Venus [H. Payne, N. Howell, and B. Tshiwala]
Follow the Pace [H. Payne, N. Howell, and Tony White]
Gotta Get Mine (featuring Mad Lion, Shinehead & Sleepy Wonder) [Archer Selwyn, Edmund Aiken, H. Payne, Norman Giscombe, N. Howell, Omar Preece, and Robert Carter]

References

1997 albums
Born Jamericans albums